Barfi! is a 2012 Indian Hindi-language romantic comedy drama film directed by Anurag Basu and produced by Ronnie Screwvala and Siddharth Roy Kapur under UTV Motion Pictures. The film stars Ranbir Kapoor as the eponymous lead, alongside Priyanka Chopra and Ileana D'Cruz in lead roles, with Saurabh Shukla, Ashish Vidyarthi, Haradhan Bandopadhyay and Jisshu Sengupta in supporting roles. Set in 1970s Darjeeling and Kolkata, the film is about Murphy "Barfi" Johnson, a deaf-mute young boy who develops a special bond with two young girls Shruti Ghosh and Jhilmil Chatterjee, while often being chased by a local police officer Inspector Sudhanshu Dutta for his nuisances.

The film received widespread critical acclaim, with critics praising the cast performances, direction, screenplay, cinematography, music and the positive portrayal of physically disabled people. The film was a major box-office success, becoming one of the highest-grossing Bollywood films of 2012 in India and overseas. The film went on to gross over  worldwide.

The film was selected as India's official entry for the Best Foreign Language Film nomination for the 85th Academy Awards. Barfi! won several awards and nominations at various award ceremonies across India. At the 58th Filmfare Awards, Barfi! received a leading 12 nominations including Best Director (Basu), Best Actress (Chopra) and Best Supporting Actress (D'Cruz), and won a leading 7 awards including Best Film, Best Actor (Kapoor), Best Female Debut (D'Cruz) and Best Music Director (Pritam).

Plot

1972 

Murphy "Barfi" Johnson is a young boy who lives in Darjeeling and is known as a troublemaker as he cuts down street-lampposts or plays practical jokes on innocent people and is often chased by Inspector Sudhanshu Dutta. Soon, Barfi meets Shruti Ghosh, an educated young girl who is new in Darjeeling. He is smitten by her heavenly beauty and charm, thus falling in love with her. However, Shruti's mother advises her over avoiding to marry him due to his disabilities and lack of money. Shruti unwillingly agrees to her mother's advice, marries Ranjeet Sengupta, and leaves Darjeeling, breaking all contact with Barfi. Shortly after Shruti's departure, Barfi's father suffers from kidney failure and is hospitalized, and Barfi is asked to arrange ₹7000 for his surgery. Meanwhile, Barfi's autistic childhood friend Jhilmil Chatterjee suddenly gets kidnapped and her wealthy father Durjoy Chatterjee asks Inspector Dutta to search for her. After an unsuccessful attempt of robbing a local bank, Barfi finds Jhilmil in an abandoned van and drives away along with her. He hides her in his apartment and sends a ₹7000 ransom note to Jhilmil's family. Her father hands over the ransom to Barfi but his father unfortunately dies just after he makes the hospital payment. A dejected Barfi leaves Jhilmil at her caretaker's house but she refuses to stay over there and makes him take her away from there. Later, Barfi cleverly escapes from Inspector Dutta along with Jhilmil and the two soon move to Kolkata.

1978 

6 years later, Barfi unexpectedly reunites with Shruti who is unhappy with her marriage with Ranjeet. She rekindles her friendship with Barfi and they begin to grow closer again, much to the jealousy of Jhilmil who then goes missing. Shruti files a missing report of Jhilmil in the police. Soon, Inspector Dutta learns about Jhilmil's loss, travels to Kolkata, and bumps into Barfi. After a comedic and entertaining chase, Inspector Dutta manages to arrest Barfi and take him to Darjeeling. Over there, another demand of ransom is made during the process of interrogation at the police station. However, Jhilmil is apparently killed during the exchange of the ransom even though her dead body is not found. The police frame Barfi for Jhilmil's murder in order to conclude the case. Inspector Dutta who grew fond of Barfi after chasing him for his nuisances, asks Shruti to take him away, offering him a second chance in life. Shruti takes Barfi back to Kolkata, hoping that she can now finally be with him due to the loss of Jhilmil. However, Barfi discovers Jhilmil's special-care home address from the scribbles that she had made at his house. He takes Shruti at the special-care home where it is revealed that both the kidnappings of Jhilmil were fabricated by her father in order to embezzle much money from her trust fund. In his second attempt, he faked her death to let her live in the special-care home, away from her alcoholic mother. Barfi and Jhilmil have a happy reunion over there and the two end up getting married.

2012 

34 years later, an elderly Barfi is shown to be severely ill in the hospital where Jhilmil lies with him on the hospital bed and they die together. Shruti narrates how they died peacefully, not wanting to leave each other behind in life or death. The film ends with the happy days of Barfi and Jhilmil being shown and the credits roll.

Cast 

 Ranbir Kapoor as Murphy Jungbahadur Johnson a.k.a. Barfi 
 Priyanka Chopra as Jhilmil Durjoy Chatterjee
 Ileana D'Cruz as Shruti Ghosh / Shruti Ranjeet Sengupta
 Saurabh Shukla as Inspector Sudhanshu Dutta 
 Ashish Vidyarthi as Durjoy Chatterjee (Jhilmil's father) 
 Akash Khurana as Jungbahadur Johnson (Barfi's father)
 Jisshu Sengupta as Ranjeet Sengupta (Shruti's fiancé turned husband)
 Roopa Ganguly as Mrs. Ghosh (Shruti's mother)
 Uday Tikekar as Mr. Ghosh (Shruti's father)
 Sumona Chakravarti as Shruti's friend
 Haradhan Bandopadhyay as Daju (Jhilmil's special-care home owner)
 Arun Bali as Jhilmil's grandfather 
 Kenneth Desai as Senior Inspector
 Rajeev Mishra as Inspector Dutta's assistant
 Preeti Dayal as Mrs. Durjoy Chatterjee (Jhilmil's mother)
 Abantika Biswas as Jhimlil's sister
 Oindrila Saha as Jhimlil's sister
 Sujata Sehgal as Ms. D'Souza (Jhilmil's special-care home caretaker)
 Bholaraj Sapkota as Bhola (Barfi's friend)

Production

Development 

During the production of his previous directorial venture Kites (2010), director Anurag Basu wrote a two-page short story which was later developed into the script of Barfi!. The film script that Basu wrote alternated between two time periods, and he retained the nonlinear narrative structure. He said that the script required a 30-year time span for the characters' love to grow and thus set the backdrop of the film in the 1970s.

In June 2010, Anurag Basu confirmed that his film would feature three lead roles, a deaf-mute man, a mentally challenged girl, and a narrator. With former titles like Khamoshi or Silence, media reports said the story was grim or dark. However, Basu stated that on the contrary, the film was happy. According to Basu, he paid homage to Buster Keaton and Charlie Chaplin by adding scenes inspired by the era of silent cinema and using physical comedy in the film, involving silent portions.

Casting 

Ranbir Kapoor was the first choice of director Anurag Basu and Katrina Kaif was the first choice for the role of the narrator. In March 2010, The Times of India reported that Ranbir Kapoor and Katrina Kaif were signed to play lead roles in the film, then titled Khamoshi and later Silence, which Basu confirmed.
Basu wanted to cast a new girl from Kolkata for the autistic character. Basu's wife, Tani suggested Chopra's name for the role. However, Basu feared that audience would see "the Priyanka Chopra" and not the character due to Chopra's stardom. Basu explained "I had the fear that I would see Priyanka Chopra in the character and Jhilmil wouldn’t work. This has happened in many films where known faces have harmed the character." Priyanka Chopra was cast to play the part but, the development was not announced as Basu wanted to workshop first and see how it goes. After three days of workshop, Basu was convinced that Chopra could play the autistic part and reflected that he was glad that he chose Chopra for the role. Later, Basu revealed that he did not approach any actress other than Chopra for the autistic part. After Chopra was cast in the film, Kaif left the project for unknown reasons. Media reported that she may have opted out of the film because Chopra had been given a stronger role. Later, media reported that Asin Thottumkal was approached to play the role of the narrator, replacing Kaif. However, Asin was never signed to the project. Media reported that no other actress wanted to sign for the film because according to them, the autistic part was stronger. In July 2010, Mumbai Mirror reported that Chopra was ready to play the role of narrator and leave the autistic role, so that another actress could be cast in the film; Chopra did not want the film to stall. Basu confirmed this development and said, "It's true we’ve been unable to cast the other part." After facing several casting problems, Basu chose to cast a completely new fresh face to play the second female role. In early December 2010, Ileana D'Cruz, a popular actress from South Indian films, was finalised for the second female lead, featuring as narrator and Kapoor's first love interest in the film, thus making her debut in Bollywood with the film.

Characters 

Kapoor played the role of a deaf and mute man in the film. According to Kapoor, he took inspiration from screen legends such as Roberto Benigni, Charlie Chaplin and his grandfather Raj Kapoor. Due to the protagonist's physical disability, Basu did not want to use any sign-language but, some behavioral patterns in the film. Kapoor described his character as a regular, happy-go-lucky and good hearted guy.

Chopra played the role of Jhilmil. Basu described Chopra's role as the "toughest" in the film. In order to prepare for the role, Chopra visited several mental institutions and spent time with autistic people. She said she had to research a little for the role because in India awareness about autism is very low. Chopra told that she had to let go of every inhibition probably that she had as a Hindi film heroine and play Jhilmil without thinking of it. She explained that she needed two moments to become Jhilmil because she didn't identify with her character due to difference between her thought and behavior.

D'cruz, who portrayed the narrator and first love interest of the protagonist said "Shruti, is such a sensitive role to play as she goes to different phases in the film." 

According to Basu, after Kapoor, Chopra and D'cruz's characters, Saurabh Shukla's character as Inspector Dutta was the most important. Basu described the role as "amazing" character, who makes others cry when he laughs.

Filming 

Principal photography commenced in March 2011. Barfi! was shot between June 2011 and February 2012, mostly in Darjeeling. In March 2011, Basu visited Kolkata to finalize the locations within the city. Filming in Mumbai began on 20 March 2011 and continued until May 2011. In June 2011, the cast and crew shot in Darjeeling. In December 2011, some scenes were filmed on the outskirts of Coimbatore, especially Pollachi and Ooty. The scenes in which Kapoor's character is chased by policemen over the roof tops were shot in Kolkata at the end of January 2012. Shooting was completed by April 2012, except for some scenes featuring Chopra. The producers postponed the release from 13 July to 31 August 2012 as the September 2011 shooting schedule was cancelled and was waiting to be shot. However, Basu began working on D'Cruz's dubbing portions by end of April 2012, because D'Cruz was unfamiliar with the Hindi language and wanted to learn it whilst filming.

Soundtrack 

The music and background score of the film is composed by Pritam Chakraborty, and lyrics were written by Swanand Kirkire, Ashish Pandit, Neelesh Misra and Sayeed Quadri. The soundtrack album has six original songs which released on 9 August 2012. The soundtrack was influenced by Brazilian Bossa nova. Priyanka Chopra was supposed to sing a track for the film, but her contract with Universal Music prevented her from taking the offer. The soundtrack album also contains a song titled "Fatafati", sung by Pritam Chakraborty, Arijit Singh & Nakash Aziz. which was not be used in the film, but the song was released as a promotional single on YouTube on 10 September 2012 with a video which contains some behind-the-scenes footage and the additional vocals are sung by Ranbir Kapoor. The song also has some Bengali lyrics written by Amitabh Bhattacharya.

Marketing and release 

The official trailer of the film was launched on 2 July 2012 featuring all the actors. It included no dialogue, portraying comedy through gestures and actions, and was well received by critics and audiences. Chopra's character was kept under wraps in the trailers as the makers were not willing to reveal much about her character to increase curiosity among the audiences and was only revealed around the release of the film. Shikha Kapur, the executive director (marketing) of UTV explained "Priyanka plays a very special character in Barfi, so we want to keep her mystery intact. In the first trailer, Barfi – played by Ranbir – will be unveiled. We don't plan to reveal Priyanka until the film releases."

UTV Motion Pictures created a YouTube application called The Flavour of Barfi, designed for the marketing the film. The application features Ranbir Kapoor as his character from the film and allows users to type actions, which Kapoor acts out. The application features two zones: one asks users to change Barfi's mood and the other gives users the chance to watch him flirt. The film was promoted in various cities across India. While promoting the film at the Phoenix Mall, Bangalore, the crowds broke through the barricades.

Barfi! was released on 14 September 2012 on 1300 screens in 700 theatres in India. Reliance Home Entertainment released Barfi! on DVD and Blu-ray in mid-November 2012 across all regions in a one-disc pack complying with the NTSC format. The DVD and the Blu-ray discs contained bonus content, including making of the film, "FatafatiBehind The Scenes" and Deleted Scenes. The Video CD version was released at the same time. The exclusive right to broadcast the film was bought by Zee Network and UTV Movies. The deal includes premiere rights of the film along with the several other UTV productions. The rights are for a period of seven-year, consisting the premiere (for both channels) of the film. Zee Network will have multiple runs while UTV Movies will have selected runs rights. The price of the deal was not revealed by the production company. The film is also available on Netflix.

In Japan, the film released in August 2014. It was released on ten screens in six Japanese cities: Tokyo, Yokohama, Nagoya Osaka, Kyoto and Fukuoka.

Controversies 
On 12 September 2012, British manufacturer Murphy Radio claimed that its trademark Murphy baby logo from its 1970s print advertisements has been used in Barfi! without permission. Producer Siddharth Roy Kapur said that he had received a legal notice from Murphy but said that there is nothing wrong in the intention, as the brand in question has been shown in a "very positive light".

After the film's release, several blogs and users of social media websites Twitter, Facebook and YouTube accused the director of plagiarism. Media further alleged that Basu had not tried to credit the original sources. Several videos were uploaded to YouTube showing side-by-side comparisons with Hollywood films like Cops, The Adventurer, City Lights, Singin' in the Rain, Project A, The Notebook and Benny & Joon. They also accused Barfi!s music director Pritam of copying the background music from the French film Amélie.

Basu defended the film by saying that he was inspired by these works and that Barfi! contains an original plot, screenplay, characters and situations. He said that he was paying homages to Keaton and Chaplin. Barfi!s Oscar selection for Best Foreign Language Film was criticized because of plagiarism, but Oscar selection committee chief Manju Borah defended the film by saying, "Barfi! deserves to be sent outside. The selection was a very open process with three to four rounds of severe discussions and came down to the best film of the final three."

Reception

India 

Barfi! received widespread critical acclaim upon release, with critics praising the cast performances, direction, screenplay, cinematography, music and the positive portrayal of physically disabled people. Zee News gave the film 5 out of 5 stars and said, "[a]ll in all, Anurag Basu's Barfi! is a perfect sweet treat for his audience. Like it has been discussed, those film makers who have been portraying the handicapped as dull and boring in their films must take a lesson from Barfi!. Madhureeta Mukherjee of The Times of India gave the film a 4/5 rating and said, "Kapoor, in the most challenging performance of his career leaves us 'dumbstruck'. Without use of conventional crutches of cool-catchphrases, dhamaakedaar-dialogbaazi, bare-bodies, and other 'items'; he stuns you in every single frame. For Chopra, there's only one wordBRAVO! In a role where she needs to under-emote, she does so brilliantly (delivering an incredible performance)."

Roshni Devi of Koimoi said, "Barfi! leaves you with that warm, cuddly, magical feeling with a few tears to match. It's really worth a watch" and gave it an overall score of 3.5 stars out of 5.
Taran Adarsh of Bollywood Hungama gave the film 4 out of 5 stars and said, "Barfi is akin to a whiff of fresh air. Its foremost triumph is that it leaves you with a powerful emotion: Happiness!" Indo-Asian News Service gave the film 4 out of 5 stars and said, "Barfi! comes as close to being a modern masterpiece as cinematically possible. To miss it would be a crime. To embrace it is to serenade the sublime". Aniruddha Guha of Daily News and Analysis rated the film 4 out of 5 and remarked that movie "engages you at a personal level", and further added that, "Barfi cannot be missed. It demands patience, but the payoff is incredible".

Pratim D. Gupta of The Telegraph said, "The brilliance of Barfi! is that it's no story and all storytelling. It's about a director at the top of his game orchestrating terrific talent into a bravura crescendo. Only someone who has showed death the door can open windows to life like this." Filmfare gave the film 4 out of 5 stars and stated, "Barfi! is that rare film that can make you smile and make you cry in the same scene. Its technical brilliance is only outdone by its emotional complexity and depth. Pritam's music adds a nice silent-era charm to this already fantastic story, making it an occasion when words simply aren't enough." Raja Sen of Rediff.com has given 3.5/5 stars and wrote, "Barfi! is a well-crafted script with an intriguing back-and-forth narrative but it all goes south towards the end."

Anupama Chopra writing for Hindustan Times gave it 3 out 5 stars and wrote, "[t]his is a film made with love, bolstered by wonderfully etched vignettes, Kapoor and Chopra's stupendous performances and a gorgeous soundtrack by Pritam. And yet, for me, Barfi! was a singularly frustrating experience there was so much to like, but the film never became more than the sum of its parts". Rajeev Masand of CNN-IBN gave 3 out of 5 stars and said, "Barfi! had the potential to be great cinema, but as it stands it's a respectable film that's still better than a lot else you're likely to see." On the contrary, Namrata Joshi of Outlook felt that "The flashback within flashback narrative gets way too clumsy and turgid, the thriller twist absolutely pointless [....] appears much too crafted and self-consciously gorgeous, and feels eminently facile and plastic".

Overseas 
The film received high critical acclaim overseas as well.  Rachel Saltz of The New York Times said, "Bollywood isn't afraid to be mawkish. Barfi! is at times, though not noticeably more so than most Hindi movies, despite its premise of special lovers with a special lesson to teach." Lisa Tsering The Hollywood Reporter called the film "a refreshingly non-commercial exercise" and added that "poignant Bollywood romantic comedy". On the performances of the cast, she wrote, "[...] Basu has guided Kapoor, and especially Chopra, to turn in exceptionally restrained, organic performances."" Ronnie Scheib of Variety wrote, "Unlike Michel Hazanavicus’ black-and-white silent homage "The Artist", Basu's film bursts with sound and color; only the speaking- and hearing-impaired Basu is condemned to silence." Gary Goldstein of the Los Angeles Times was more critical of the film, despite praising aspect including "the hard-working cast, a lush score, exotic location shooting and scattered warmth", called it as "more of an endurance test than entertainment."

Accolades 

Barfi! has received various awards and nominations in categories ranging mostly from recognition of the film itself, to its cinematography, direction, screenplay, and music, to the cast's performances. The film was selected as India's official entry for the Best Foreign Language Film nomination for the 85th Academy Awards. The film received a leading 13 nominations at the 58th Filmfare Awards, and won a leading 7 awards, including Best Film, Best Actor (Kapoor), Best Female Debut (D'Cruz) and Best Music Director (Pritam). Barfi! received a leading 23 nominations at the 19th Screen Awards, winning 9, including Best Director (Basu), Best Actor (Kapoor), and Jodi No. 1 (Kapoor and Chopra). At the 14th Zee Cine Awards, Barfi! received 9 nominations, and won 8 awards, including Best Film, Best Director (Basu) and Best Actress (Chopra).

Box office 
Upon its release, Barfi! started strongly at multiplexes throughout India, with around 80–90% occupancy, but had lower opening takings because of a limited release. The film grossed  on its opening day. Its second day saw an increase of around 35% occupancy and collected . In its opening weekend, the film grossed . In its first week, Barfi! collected  nett, and by its eighth day had earned  despite the release of Heroine. Barfi! earned  in its second weekend. Barfi! had a good second week where it has collected  nett. In the third week, the film's takings rose to  nett. and it took  in its fourth week. The film became one of the highest-grossing Bollywood films of 2012 in India, and was declared a "Super Hit" after its three-week run by Box Office India. The film went on to gross  worldwide.

See also 
 List of submissions to the 85th Academy Awards for Best Foreign Language Film
 List of Indian submissions for the Academy Award for Best Foreign Language Film

References

External links 

 
 
 
 

2012 romantic comedy-drama films
2012 films
Films about autism
Films set in Darjeeling
Films set in the 1970s
Films shot in India
Films shot in Kolkata
Films shot in Mumbai
Films shot in Ooty
2010s Hindi-language films
Indian romantic comedy-drama films
Indian nonlinear narrative films
Films involved in plagiarism controversies
Films featuring songs by Pritam
UTV Motion Pictures films
2012 comedy films
2012 drama films
Films directed by Anurag Basu